BNS Salam  is a modified Type 021 gunboat of the Bangladesh Navy. She was commissioned into the Bangladesh Navy in 2002.

Design

The ship's armament consists of one 40 mm AA gun and twin 30 mm AA guns. She is equipped with one Type 352 Square Tie radar for surface search.

Service
The ship was commissioned into the Bangladesh Navy as BNS Durnibar on 10 November 1988. She was severely damaged in the cyclone of April 1991 and sunk into Karnaphuli river. Later, she was salvaged, renovated and modified into a gunboat. In 2002, she was recommissioned into the Bangladesh Navy as BNS Salam

See also
Fast attack craft
List of active ships of the Bangladesh Navy

References

Ships of the Bangladesh Navy
Gunboats of the Bangladesh Navy